King Faisal Road, formerly al-Wazir Street is a 5 km historic and commercial street in southern Riyadh, Saudi Arabia, running from the east of al-Bateha neighborhood to al-Murabba via Jabrah and ad-Dirah. The name 'al-Wazir' was derived from the nickname of the country's first finance minister, Abdullah bin Suleiman al-Hamdan, who was better known as Wazīr Kullī Shaīʾ. It was later renamed after the third king of Saudi Arabia, Faisal ibn Abdulaziz. The street was once a preferred destination for commercial activity in the city and was also a bustling marketplace for imported and domestic goods.

Landmarks 

 Yara International School

References 

Roads in Saudi Arabia